The Yano's snipe eel (Labichthys yanoi) is an eel in the family Nemichthyidae (snipe eels). It was described by Giles Willis Mead and Ira Rubinoff in 1966, originally under the genus Avocettinops. It is a marine, deep water-dwelling eel which is known from New Zealand, in the southwestern Pacific Ocean.

References

Nemichthyidae
Taxa named by Giles Willis Mead
Taxa named by Ira Rubinoff
Fish described in 1966